The Children's Book of the Year Award: Younger Readers has been presented annually since 1982 by the Children's Book Council of Australia (CBCA). Note: from 1982 to 1986 this award was titled Junior Book of the Year.

The Award "will be made to outstanding books of fiction, drama, poetry or concept books for readers who have developed independent reading skills but are still developing in literary appreciation.  Generally, books in this category will be appropriate in style and content for readers from the middle to upper primary years."

Award winners
The most awarded author is Emily Rodda, with six awards.

1980s

1990s

2000s

2010s

2020s

See also 

 List of CBCA Awards
 List of Australian literary awards

External links
 CBCA Awards History

References

Awards established in 1982
Children's Book Council of Australia
1982 establishments in Australia
Children's literary awards
English-language literary awards